Gertrude Guillaume-Schack (9 November 1845 – 20 May 1903) was a German women's rights activist who pioneered the fight against state-regulated prostitution in Germany, where she was born. She met considerable resistance due to the prevailing belief that such matters should not be discussed by respectable people, especially women. She also became active in organizing workers associations for German women, and was linked to the Social Democratic Party (SPD). Her activities and political views caused her to be exiled by the German authorities. She moved to England in 1886, where she became involved in Socialist organizations, but fell out with Friedrich Engels. After leaving the English Socialist League she became involved in theosophy. Refusal to accept medical treatment may have contributed to her early death of untreated breast cancer.

Early years 

Gertrud Schack was born in the village of Uschütz, Silesia, Germany, near what is now Gorzów Śląski, on 9 November 1845.
Her parents were Count Alexander Schack von Wittenau and Elizabeth, Countess of Königsdorf.
Her father's family belonged to the old nobility of Lower Silesia.
Her father, Count Schack, was an open-minded and wise man who exercised great influence on his gifted daughter.
In 1862, when Gertrud was seventeen years old, her parents left their estate and bought a villa in Beuthen an der Oder.
Her father sent Gertrud to live with a sister, asking her to visit him often.

In the autumn of 1873 she moved to Neufchatel, Switzerland.
In 1876 she married a Swiss painter, and lived for a while with him in his parents' house.
Her husband was Edouard Guillaume of Les Verrières, Neuchatel.
Her brother-in-law was James Guillaume, an anarchist closely associated with Mikhail Bakunin.
The newlyweds moved to Paris, but it turned out that her husband was not willing to commit to marriage and abandon his bachelor habits, and Gertrude was constrained to demand a divorce.
In the summer of 1878 she returned home from Paris.

Abolitionist 
While in Paris Guillaume-Schack became active in the abolitionist movement started by Josephine Butler of England to fight state-regulated prostitution. She began the campaign in Germany with the same goals.
In her view, compulsory medical examinations and other regulations imposed on prostitutes penalized the women, but ignored their male clients.
In January 1879 she went to Berlin to work for the cause, and in May 1879 gave her first lectures to very small audiences.
She spoke publicly against state-regulated prostitution in the city hall of Berlin on 14 May 1880, but very few people turned up to hear her.
On 7 March 1880 she founded the Deutscher Kulturbund (German Cultural Association) in Berlin.
The Deutscher Kulturbund was, in effect, the first chapter of what would become the International Abolitionist Federation (IAF) in Germany.
Technically, it was independent of the IAF, due to restrictions imposed by the laws of Prussia, and was based in Beuthen an der Oder,
however, it followed the principles that Butler had defined.

Although she was supported by the leaders of the Berlin's women's movement, Lina Morgenstern and Franziska Tiburtius, progress was slow. Many respectable people thought that it was not proper for them to discuss prostitution publicly.
Guillaume-Schack expressed this view when she opened a public talk in 1882 by saying, "perhaps it will have surprised you, that a matter so difficult to handle as the morality question should be discussed in public, and perhaps yet more that I, a woman, want to speak about it."
The Prussian Law of Association, which remained in force until 1908, also restricted the right of women to meet and talk about social and political issues in public.

Guillaume-Schack spoke at many events and meetings. The Bulletin Continental, the organ of the British, Continental and General Federation (the future IAF), reported that in January and February 1882 she had spoken in Breslau, Liegnitz, Berlin, Hanover, Bonn, Cologne, and Düsseldorf.
In March she attended meetings in Elberfeld, Barmen, Wiesbaden, and then Darmstadt, where a large mixed meeting including women and girls was organized in the gymnasium. The audience had been told of the subject in advance, and listened quietly other than a few male hecklers at the front. She told them that the morality police were a source of difficulty for a young fallen woman who wanted to return to an honest life. At this, the police commissioner and his agents went up to her and demanded that she stop her speech, since it was immoral.

The following day Guillaume-Schack and another participant were charged for having disturbed the peace and caused grave disorders.
Her trial was due to her effrontery in simply speaking openly about prostitution.
At the trial it was confirmed that Guillaume-Schack had been dignified and serious. The trial turned into an inquiry into the vice squad, while the two defendants were acquitted.
It emerged that children of thirteen or fourteen years of age could be registered as prostitutes and allowed to practice this trade as long as they followed police regulations, the only trade a minor could follow without the permission of their parents.
In 1882 Guillaume-Schack published the polemical Über unsere sittlichen Verhältnisse ("About our moral relations") concerning prostitution and white slavery.
The movement gradually came to life. The Berlin branch of the Cultural Association was allowed to hold meetings in a room at the Ministry of Religion and Justice, where they distributed a number of leaflets and brochures. Some of the worst excesses of the system were curtailed.
Despite interference from the police the organization grew to twelve branches. Many of its members were feminists.
They tried to help girls and women, and also to end regulated prostitution in Germany, a system that let these women "fall".

Guillaume-Schack met the Silesian activist Lina Morgenstern, and they founded the Verein zur Rettung und Erziehung minorenner strafentlassener Mädchen ("Association for the Rescue and Education of Girls Dismissed of Criminal Charges"), which ran a hostel for young women seeking work.
It was located opposite the newly opened main Berlin railway station.
In August 1885 Guillaume-Shack visited Berne and gave two public talks to audiences of women, leading to formation the next year of the Association of Berne Women to Improve Morality.
The authorities banned Guillaume-Schack due to her public meetings on abolitionist issues, and her association with the banned Social Democratic Party (SPD).

German Socialist 
In 1884 Guillaume-Schack founded the Central-Kranken- und Begräbniskasse für Frauen und Mädchen in Deutschland (Central Ambulance and Funeral Fund for Women and Girls in Germany).
This was a front organization for unauthorized workers associations as well as a regional platform.
It sparked activity among working women, and soon grew to 20,000 members.
In 1885 Guillaume-Schack and Emma Ihrer founded the Verein zur Vertretung der Interessen der Arbeiterinnen (the Association to Promote the Interests of Working Women) in Berlin in collaboration with the SDP.
Guillaume-Schack was elected honorary President of the Berlin workers association.
It was banned after a year as a political organization.

Guillaume-Schack joined the SPD in 1885. She was strongly opposed to special regulations for women's work and organized protests against proposed protective legislation for women when it was debated in the Reichstag in 1885.
Guillaume-Schack undertook a lecture tour of Germany during which, despite massive police intervention, she managed to found workers associations in many other cities on the Berlin model.
Encouraged by Guillaume-Schack, other women ventured to speak out and make organizational tours.
Guillaume-Schack spoke at meetings of German women workers associations, where she attacked militarism and advanced socialist ideas.
Guillaume also attended many meetings in Switzerland where she spoke of the misery of working women.
She supported creation of the first associations of working women and housewives.

In January 1886 Guillaume-Schack launched Die Staatsbürgerin (The Citizeness), a newspaper, in Offenbach am Main.
The paper reported the meetings of working women's associations, gave statistics on working conditions and wages, and gave news and commentary on the wage struggles.
Die Staatsbürgerin, the first German journal for working women, was prohibited and pulped after just six months of publication.
By marrying a Swiss Guillaume-Schack was considered to have given up her German citizenship.
She was barred from living in several cities in Germany, and then deported, allowed to return only for short family visits.

England 

Guillaume-Schack arrived in England in 1886. She met Friedrich Engels, who found her pleasant, intelligent and amusing company, but was suspicious about the links she had made outside the socialist movement. He wrote of her earlier abolitionist activities, "in pursuing it she is in league with the religious bourgeois ladies of the Anti-Contagious-Disease Acts Agitation and with sundry anarchist elements in the Socialist League." He also looked down on women, writing that as soon as they began to disagree with each other they would tell tales about party activities, and might go as far as denouncing their comrades to the police. In July 1885 Engels wrote to Guillaume-Schack "it is my conviction that real equality of women and men can come true only when the exploitation of either by capital has been abolished and private housework has been transformed into a public industry.

Engels disliked resolute and intelligent women who were not pretty and whose surname was not Marx.
He particularly disliked middle-aged female intellectuals such as the theosophist, Annie Besant, the journalist, Emily Crawford, and Gertrude Guillaume-Schack. 
Engels greeted the campaign for women's suffrage with scorn, writing of, "these presumptuous little women who make so much noise for the rights of women", saying their cause was a diversion behind which class rule would continue to thrive.
Guillaume-Schack broke with Engels in 1887. A dispute over Edward Aveling was said to be the cause.

In 1887 Guillaume-Schack spoke in opposition to the official SDP position on protective legislation for women. She became sympathetic to the anarchists of the Socialist League.
She was active in the Socialist League from 1887–90 and participated in the International Socialist Workers Congress of Paris on 14 July 1889 as a representative of the International Working Men's Club.

In 1895 Guillaume-Schack attended the committee meeting of the Women's Franchise League in Aberystwyth together with Ursula Mellor Bright, Mrs Behrens, Esther? Bright, Herbert Burrows, Dr Clark MP, Mrs Hunter of Matlock Bank, Jane Brownlow, Mrs E. James (who lived locally), H.N.Mozley, Alice Cliff Scatcherd, Jane Cobden Unwin and Dr and Mrs Pankhurst. 

Guillaume-Schack became interested in theosophy around the end of the nineteenth century.
She died on 20 May 1903 in Surbiton, aged 57. 
Gertrude Guillaume Schack was described in a coroner's inquest as a Theosophist, Socialist lecturer, temperance advocate, and a strict vegetarian. 
About twelve months earlier she had fallen over a tin box in her bedroom and injured her breast.
She had consulted a former doctor whose name had been removed from the register, but in whom she had great faith. He had urged her to see a specialist, but she had refused, saying as a theosophist she saw death as just a transition from one state to another, and would not have any interference with her body.
A doctor was called in a few hours before her death, but her condition was too far advanced for him to be able to offer any treatment.
The cause of death was recorded as cancer of the breast, accelerated by want of proper surgical dressing and food.

Legacy 

In her day Gertrud Guillaume-Schack was one of the most compelling voices in Germany.
Max Kretzer  (1854–1941) dedicated his 1882 novel Die Betrogenen (The Deceived) to Gertrude Guillaume, born Countess Schack.
It told of a working girl who was seduced and later became a prostitute.
Guillaume-Schack was a strong believer in the views of August Bebel.
The famous work by Bebel entitled Die Frau und der Sozialismus (1879), with its description of the British campaign against the Contagious Diseases Acts and Guillaume Schack's campaign in Germany reflected her influence.

Guillaume-Schack and Lily Braun were the only two aristocratic women to join the SDP.
Braun wrote a history of the women worker's movement of Germany in which she gave Guillaume-Schack credit for developing the movement.
This was unfair to women such as Clara Zetkin, who continued to work in Germany after Guillaume-Schack had left for England.
After Guillaume-Schack's exile the cause of protecting women and girls in Germany was first taken up by more conservative men and women.
The abolitionist movement that she had established became known as the Sittlichkeit ("purity") movement, and was led by antisemites such as Pastor Ludwig Weber, and Dr. Adolf Stoecker. Members could not be socialist and must be Christian.
Within a decade, though, young and liberal women who had heard her speak in London took up the Abolitionist cause in Germany including Anna Pappritz, Anita Augspurg, Katharina Scheven, and Minna Cauer.

References

Sources 

1845 births
1903 deaths
Deaths from breast cancer
Deaths from cancer in England
German anti-capitalists
German emigrants to England
German emigrants to Switzerland
German socialists
German Theosophists
People from Olesno County
People from the Province of Silesia
Schack von Wittenau family
German socialist feminists
Swiss feminists
Swiss socialist feminists